Cagney & Lacey is an American police procedural drama television series that aired on the CBS television network for seven seasons from March 25, 1982, to May 16, 1988. The show is about two New York City police detectives who lead very different lives: Christine Cagney (Sharon Gless) is a career-minded single woman, while Mary Beth Lacey (Tyne Daly) is a married working mother. The series is set in a fictionalized version of Manhattan's 14th Precinct (known as "Midtown South"). The pilot movie had Loretta Swit in the role of Cagney, while the first six episodes had Meg Foster in the role. When the show was revived for a full-season run, Gless portrayed the role for six consecutive years. Each year during that time, one of the two lead actresses won the Emmy for Best Lead Actress in a Drama (four wins for Daly, two for Gless), a winning streak matched only once since in any major category by a show.

Development
Producer Barney Rosenzweig was influenced by the feminist movement through his then-girlfriend Barbara Corday, who recommended to him Molly Haskell's book From Reverence to Rape. After learning through Haskell that there had never been a female buddy film, Rosenzweig sought to make one, a comedy initially titled Newman & Redford (before changing the title for legal reasons). Corday & Barbara Avedon wrote the script. No studio wanted to make the film, so Corday considered taking it to television. Rosenzweig took the script, removed the main plot (leaving only the character development), and took it to all networks, but only CBS picked it up.

Original cast
Actress Loretta Swit played the role of Christine Cagney in the original television movie (October 1981), but was forced to decline the role in the series when the producers of M*A*S*H refused to let her out of her contract. When the movie was picked up as a series, first airing with six episodes as a midseason replacement in the spring of 1982, Meg Foster portrayed the character. When the show was picked up for a regular season in 1982, Foster was replaced with Sharon Gless because CBS deemed Foster too aggressive and too likely to be perceived as a lesbian by the viewers.

CBS executives hoped Gless would portray Cagney as more feminine and attempted to pressure the producers to remake Christine into a more "high-class", snobbish woman from wealthy parents. The pilot had portrayed Cagney as an ex-glamour model. Barney Rosenzweig and Barbara Corday initially refused to change Cagney from a tough, witty, working-class woman. Shortly into Gless's tenure on the program, Rosenzweig and Corday compromised with the network brass. They further developed Cagney's background, explaining gradually in a loose storyline that she may have been born to a somewhat well-to-do professional mother, Maureen, who had a relationship with police officer Charles Cagney (Dick O'Neill), who came from working-class roots. They separated soon after Christine and her brother Brian (David Ackroyd) were born. She was partially raised in an uptown Westchester world, which she appreciated; however, the trappings of the upper-middle social strata sometimes drove her to miss her father's lifestyle, and she and her father therefore established a special bond.

Cagney was a bit quieter and more reserved than her vivacious, talkative, loud partner Mary Beth Lacey, but could still relate to the world with attitudes that could be shared by people across the social spectrum.

Synopsis

Al Waxman co-starred as Cagney and Lacey's good-natured and sometimes blustery supervisor, Lt. Bert Samuels. Carl Lumbly and Martin Kove played, respectively, fellow detectives Marcus Petrie and Victor Isbecki. Sidney Clute played veteran detective Paul La Guardia. John Karlen co-starred as Mary Beth's husband, Harvey Lacey, and Tony La Torre and Troy Slaten played their sons, Harvey Lacey Jr. and Michael Lacey, respectively. Harvey Atkin played desk sergeant Ronald Coleman. Jason Bernard had the recurring role of Deputy Inspector Marquette during the first two seasons. When the show was brought back in March 1984, Marquette had been replaced by Dep. Inspector Knelman (Michael Fairman), who lasted the duration of the series. In the fourth season, Christine entered into a relationship with Sgt. Dory McKenna (Barry Primus), who battled a drug addiction. After a tumultuous courtship, Christine left him and soon after took up with a more stable suitor, David Keeler (Stephen Macht), a local attorney.

One of the most significant cast changes occurred early in the fifth season, upon the death of Sidney Clute from cancer on October 2, 1985, at the age of 69. Off-screen, Det. LaGuardia had retired from the 14th Precinct and moved to New Jersey with a new female companion less than half his age. Clute had completed filming a few episodes of the 1985–86 season prior to his death. In his honor, the producers kept Clute's name in the opening credits for the rest of the series.

LaGuardia's immediate replacement in the fifth season was Det. Jonah Newman (Dan Shor), a boyish ingenue with an elevated sense of himself. Newman, while popular with the guys, was not above stepping on anyone in order to get the coveted promotion of Detective Second Grade. As a result, Chris and Mary Beth had to force a strained relationship with him at best. Newman developed a crush on Chris but she never knew. Eventually, Newman was partnered with veteran Al Corassa (Paul Mantee), who became a regular midway through season five (Mantee had made three guest appearances in late 1985, in which his character's name was Det. Thomas in the first two episodes, and Corassa in the third) and officially took up the role of experience that LaGuardia had vacated. Their partnership met a sad end in May 1986, when Newman was killed from a random gunshot outside of the local district court, just after receiving his promotion to Second Grade.

The beginning of the sixth season saw the arrival of Manny Esposito (Robert Hegyes), a young, street-savvy detective who became Corassa's new partner. There was quite a clash between the two, as Esposito's freewheeling lifestyle (represented by his casual dress on the job, the desire to make a quick buck, and three ex-wives) put him in contrast with Corassa, the older, more conservative family man with a heightened sense of professionalism. Supporting characters added to the precinct at this time were rookie Officer Tom Basil (Barry Laws) and Officer Beverley Faverty (Beverley Faverty). The following year, Petrie was promoted to sergeant and then departed the 14th Precinct (Carl Lumbly had decided to leave the series). In his place, singer Merry Clayton joined the cast as Verna Dee Jordan, the first new female detective at the precinct since the additions of Cagney and Lacey. Jordan had joined law enforcement in middle age to better herself, after having been a single mother raising four children (now grown) on welfare.

Dick O'Neill played a recurring role as Cagney's alcoholic father, Charlie Cagney, a former NYPD officer who regaled her with stories of the old days; Christine later fought alcoholism as well. In the fourth season, Mary Beth becomes pregnant; she and Harvey welcome in a baby daughter, Alice Christine, in the fall of 1985. Alice Lacey was played by alternating twins Dana & Paige Bardolph from 1985 to 1987, with toddler Michelle Sepe taking over for the seventh season.

Cancellation and return

Cagney & Lacey premiered in March 1982 with high hopes from the industry, in the wake of the TV movie. Reviews of the series, however, with Meg Foster in place of Loretta Swit, were mixed. Critics praised the level of storytelling, but put emphasis on the aggressiveness that both Daly and Foster expressed with their characters. As soon as the six-episode order was finished in late April, CBS canceled the program due to poor ratings. Executive producer Barney Rosenzweig was determined to reverse the network's decision. Sharon Gless had been initially unavailable for the movie and series, which were produced by Orion, because of her long-running contract to Universal Television (she was the last actress ever to be signed to a long-term contract with a studio, in 1972). Gless was even actively utilizing her Universal contract at the time the series went into production, having taken over as female lead (from Lynn Redgrave who left the series in a dispute with producers) on the CBS sitcom House Calls. Those rumors were also rampant that House Calls was getting the axe that spring.

Prior to the unveiling of that year's network upfronts, a CBS executive noted to the press that the cancellation of Cagney & Lacey was highly motivated by the jarringly tough nature of the female leads as well as low ratings. The official claimed in response to the strong portrayal of Daly and Foster that "we've perceived them as dykes". This remark set off massive protest, and put Rosenzweig into high gear in his dealings with CBS. The cancellation of House Calls was announced among insider circles just before upfronts, and Rosenzweig pressured CBS executives to relaunch Cagney & Lacey in the fall with Gless replacing Foster. Gless met with Cagney & Lacey producers again to consider the role, but while always having taken to the character, had doubts about joining for the fall of 1982 because, after House Calls, she "didn't want to make a career of replacing actresses".

Ratings were still low during the first year Daly and Gless co-starred on the series. Cagney & Lacey was canceled by CBS a second time in May 1983, but after almost a year of decreased buzz about the show, an ever-larger public outcry exploded upon the series's axing. Fans of the show, organized by Rosenzweig, staged a letter-writing campaign. At the same time, CBS switched its time slot for what was to have been its final three months on the air during summer reruns. This relocation resulted in the ratings suddenly rising. The viewer protest, coupled with the post-cancellation improvement in the Nielsens and the Emmy nomination that year (which Tyne Daly won in September), resulted in success for the public. That fall, CBS announced the return of Cagney & Lacey as a mid-season entry. The network would have wanted to return it sooner, but not long after the second cancelation came to pass, the sets at Orion had already been destroyed, and the cast had been let out of their contracts. One cast member, Tony La Torre, had already joined another series, the ABC sitcom 9 to 5. When nearly all of the Cagney & Lacey cast received new contracts in late 1983, La Torre returned as well after 9 to 5 was canceled by ABC just weeks into the 1983–84 season. Cagney & Lacey went back into production in January 1984 and returned to air on March 19 of that year.

TV Guide celebrated the show's return with the cover reading "Welcome Back, Cagney & Lacey – You want them! You've got them!". The show finished in the top 10 for the 1983–84 season, and went on to earn 36 Emmy Award nominations and 14 wins throughout its run until 1988, including six nominations each for stars Daly and Gless: four wins for Daly and two for Gless. The series itself won two consecutive Emmy Awards for Best Drama Series in 1985 and 1986. The show's ratings leveled out to where it hovered around 30th place in the Nielsens during seasons four to six, a period where many state the show to have been in its creative peak.

The series continued to air Monday nights at 10:00p.m. EST/9:00p.m. CST until the middle of the 1987–88 season, holding its own against ABC's Monday Night Football and NBC Monday Night at the Movies. Midway through its seventh season, Cagney & Lacey was moved to Tuesdays at 10:00p.m. EST/9:00p.m. CST, where it began to compete against Thirtysomething (ABC) and Crime Story (NBC). Cagney & Lacey lost viewers to the first-year critical success of thirtysomething, which, despite being the time slot winner, only ranked No. 45 overall. CBS' reason for relocating Cagney & Lacey was because it was believed that its Monday slot would further build an audience for Wiseguy, another new critical hit of the season that had average ratings at best. By the end of the season, Cagney & Lacey was left at 53rd place, and the 20-point drop from the previous season was enough for CBS to have doubts about renewing the show. With the final episode of the seventh season ending on a cliffhanger, CBS was considering bringing the show back, but when May 1988 upfronts were released, Cagney & Laceys cancellation was confirmed. For the summer of 1988, the series moved one last time, not back to its familiar Monday time slot, but to Thursdays at 10 pm EST/9 CST. The series garnered considerable popularity internationally. It was originally shown in the UK on BBC1, where it regularly made the top 10.

Theme music
The first-season main titles are accompanied by the theme song "Ain't That the Way" by Michael Stull, sung by Marie Cain, and shows the two lead characters being promoted to plainclothes detectives and later disguised as prostitutes. This was replaced the following season by an instrumental theme composed by Bill Conti set to a collage of action and comical scenes featuring the characters from the series.

Reception

Nielsen ratings

Awards and nominations

Primetime Emmy Awards
1983 Nomination for Outstanding Drama Series
1983 Award for Outstanding Lead Actress in a Drama Series (Tyne Daly)
1983 Nomination for Outstanding Lead Actress in a Drama Series (Sharon Gless)
1984 Nomination for Outstanding Drama Series
1984 Award for Outstanding Lead Actress in a Drama Series (Tyne Daly)
1984 Nomination for Outstanding Lead Actress in a Drama Series (Sharon Gless)
1985 Award for Outstanding Drama Series
1985 Award for Outstanding Lead Actress in a Drama Series (Tyne Daly)
1985 Award for Outstanding Directing in a Drama Series (Karen Arthur)
1985 Nomination for Outstanding Lead Actress in a Drama Series (Sharon Gless)
1985 Nomination for Outstanding Supporting Actor in a Drama Series (John Karlen)
1986 Award for Outstanding Drama Series
1986 Nomination for Outstanding Lead Actress in a Drama Series (Tyne Daly)
1986 Award for Outstanding Lead Actress in a Drama Series (Sharon Gless)
1986 Award for Outstanding Supporting Actor in a Drama Series (John Karlen)
1986 Award for Outstanding Directing in a Drama Series (Georg Stanford Brown)
1987 Nomination for Outstanding Drama Series
1987 Nomination for Outstanding Directing in a Drama Series (Sharron Miller)
1987 Nomination for Outstanding Lead Actress in a Drama Series (Tyne Daly)
1987 Award for Outstanding Lead Actress in a Drama Series (Sharon Gless)
1987 Nomination for Outstanding Supporting Actor in a Drama Series (John Karlen)
1988 Award for Outstanding Lead Actress in a Drama Series (Tyne Daly)
1988 Nomination for Outstanding Lead Actress in a Drama Series (Sharon Gless)

Golden Globe Awards
1983 Nomination for Best Actress in a Drama Series (Tyne Daly)
1983 Nomination for Best Drama Series
1984 Nomination for Best Actress in a Drama Series (Tyne Daly)
1984 Nomination for Best Actress in a Drama Series (Sharon Gless)
1984 Nomination for Best Drama Series
1985 Nomination for Best Actress in a Drama Series (Tyne Daly)
1985 Award for Best Actress in a Drama Series (Sharon Gless)
1985 Nomination for Best Drama Series
1986 Nomination for Best Actress in a Drama Series (Tyne Daly)
1986 Nomination for Best Actress in a Drama Series (Sharon Gless)
1986 Nomination for Best Drama Series
1987 Nomination for Best Actress in a Drama Series (Sharon Gless)
1988 Nomination for Best Actress in a Drama Series (Sharon Gless)

Directors Guild Awards
1987 Nomination for Best Director in a Drama Series (Sharron Miller)

After the series

The series was followed by four television films which reunite the characters Christine Cagney and Mary Beth Lacey. In the storyline, Cagney has been promoted to Lieutenant, and is now working at the District Attorney's office as a special investigator. Lacey, meanwhile, has retired from the police force. However, at Cagney's urging (and partly due to Mary Beth's strained financial circumstances), Mary Beth agrees to work for the D.A.'s office as well, thereby reuniting the old partnership.

John Karlen appears in all four movies as Harvey Lacey, as does Molly Orr playing Harvey and Mary Beth's school-age daughter Alice (who was seen as an infant in various series episodes). Making cameos in the first movie only are series regulars Martin Kove as Isbecki, Al Waxman as Lt. Samuels, Carl Lumbly as Marcus Petrie, Vonetta McGee as Claudia Petrie, Robert Hegyes as Esposito, and Paul Mantee as Corassa. Also seen in the first two films are James Naughton as Christine's husband James Burton (they soon were divorced), and David Paymer as Deputy D.A. Feldberg.

Cagney & Lacey: The Return (1994)
Cagney & Lacey: Together Again (1995)
Cagney & Lacey: The View Through the Glass Ceiling (1995)
Cagney & Lacey: True Convictions (1996)

Following the conclusion of Cagney & Lacey, Tyne Daly and Sharon Gless have reunited onscreen three times: all three times playing different characters. Daly guest-starred in an episode of Gless's 1990 series The Trials of Rosie O'Neill; Gless then guest-starred in 2003 on an episode of Daly's TV series Judging Amy, while Daly appeared in 2010 in an episode of Gless's series Burn Notice.

In popular culture
In the television show Brooklyn Nine-Nine, Lieutenant Terry Jeffords' twin daughters are named Cagney and Lacey.

Home media
On May 8, 2007, MGM Home Entertainment and 20th Century Fox Home Entertainment released Season 1 of Cagney & Lacey on DVD in Region 1. The release coincided with the 25th anniversary of the series and it features the first full season of the show (which is actually the second season of the series) when Sharon Gless joined the cast as Cagney.

The quartet of TV movies entitled The Menopause Years was released in 2009 by S'more Entertainment. The deluxe set contains the complete collection of post-series TV movies. In addition, one of the features, Cagney & Lacey: The Return, was released separately on the same day. As of 2012, these releases have been discontinued and are out of print.

In November 2012, Visual Entertainment released Cagney & Lacey – The Complete Series on DVD in Region 1. The 32-disc set contains all episodes of the series featuring Tyne Daly and Sharon Gless (seasons 2–7). They also released a separate season 2 release on the same day.

A separate collection only available to purchase online, entitled Cagney & Lacey – 30th Anniversary Limited Edition was released on November 27, 2012. This 38-disc set contains all the content from the Complete Series set as well as the pilot episode, the complete first season with Meg Foster as Cagney and Tyne Daly as Lacey, all four post-series Cagney & Lacey: The Menopause Years made-for-TV movies and special bonus features exclusive to this collection, such as an autographed photo from Sharon Gless and Tyne Daly, an audiobook of Barney Rosenzweig's "Cagney & Lacey ... and Me" An Inside Hollywood Story OR How I Learned to Stop Worrying and Love the Blonde, and footage of the British Film Institute's Cagney & Lacey 30th Anniversary Event from London. The Limited Edition DVD set is available through the official Cagney & Lacey website.

Downloads
Since October 2009, all 125 episodes of Cagney & Lacey have been available as a digital download on iTunes in the UK and North America and were also licensed to Netflix for American viewers via the streaming option, which expired in April 2012, and is no longer available. In 2011, the four post-series telefilms were also added to the streaming option after they were licensed to Netflix partner Starz. That partnership ended in February 2012, and the telefilms ceased to run on Netflix streaming.

Cagney & Lacey: The Lost Episodes — 6 episodes from Season 1
Cagney & Lacey: The True Beginning — 22 episodes from Season 2
Season 3 — 7 episodes from Season 3
Season 4 — 22 episodes from Season 4
Season 5 — all 24 episodes from Season 5
Season 6 — all 22 episodes from Season 6
Season 7 — all 22 episodes from Season 7

Aborted reboot
In January 2018, CBS ordered a pilot for a reboot of the series. In March, Sarah Drew and Michelle Hurd were cast as Cagney and Lacey, respectively, with Bridget Carpenter writing the pilot and Rosemary Rodriguez directing. Ving Rhames was cast in the role of police Captain Stark. CBS passed on the pilot on May 11.

See also

Scott & Bailey – a UK TV series with a similar premise
Rizzoli & Isles

References

External links
Cagney & Lacey Official Website
Cagney & Lacey Official Episode Guide

Entry at Encyclopedia of Television
Sharon Gless Official Website

Cagney & Lacey Shrine

1982 American television series debuts
1988 American television series endings
1980s American crime drama television series
1980s American mystery television series
1980s American police procedural television series
1980s American workplace drama television series
American detective television series
American television series revived after cancellation
CBS original programming
English-language television shows
Fictional portrayals of the New York City Police Department
Primetime Emmy Award for Outstanding Drama Series winners
Television duos
Television series by MGM Television
Television shows set in Manhattan
Television series by Filmways